Hierochloe australis is a species of flowering plant belonging to the family Poaceae.

Synonyms:
 Anthoxanthum australe (Schrad.) Veldkamp
 Avena odorata var. aristata Lam. & DC.
 Hierochloe aristata Wulfen
 Hierochloe odorata var. aristata (Lam. & DC.) Fiori
 Holcus australis Schrad.

References

Pooideae